Gnaphosa lucifuga is a ground spider species with Palearctic distribution.

It is the type species of its genus. The type locality is situated in France. The holotype is located at Musée National d'Histoire Naturelle, Paris.

See also 
 List of Gnaphosidae species

References

External links 

Gnaphosidae
Spiders of Europe
Arthropods of Turkey
Spiders described in 1802
Palearctic spiders